KYYT (102.3 FM, "Gorge Country Y102") is a radio station broadcasting a country music format. Licensed to Goldendale, Washington, United States, the station is currently owned by Shannon Milburn and Colette Carpenter, through licensee Gorge Country Media, Inc., and features programming from Citadel Media and Dial Global.

References

External links

Country radio stations in the United States
YYT
Klickitat County, Washington
Radio stations established in 1992
1992 establishments in Washington (state)